Center of My World is a 2016 coming-of-age romantic drama film directed by Jakob M. Erwa, based on the 1998 best-selling novel The Center of the World by Andreas Steinhöfel.

Plot
17-year-old Phil comes back from a summer camp and returns to the old mansion Visible where he lives with his mother, Glass, and his twin sister, Dianne. They barely have contact with the other citizens of this village, who consider Phil's family to be strange—Dianne is said to be able to talk with animals. However, they are often visited by Tereza, a lawyer, who always has some good advice for Phil. Phil does notice that something has changed between his mother and his sister and that they do not talk to each other anymore. He spends the last days of his summer holidays with his best friend Kat. When school begins, the mysterious Nicholas enters the class. Phil feels drawn to him and they soon engage in a passionate love affair, even though it turns Phil's feelings upside down because he does not know what Nicholas thinks of him. Furthermore, his friendship with Kat is tested because Phil's first love causes envy and jealousy. Finding his center of the world becomes Phil's biggest challenge.

Cast
 Louis Hofmann as Phil
 Sabine Timoteo as Glass
 Jannik Schümann as Nicholas
 Ada Philine Stappenbeck as Dianne
 Svenja Jung as Kat
  as Michael
 Inka Friedrich as Tereza
 Nina Proll as Pascal
  as Herr Hänel, teacher
 Clemens Rehbein as Kyle

Production
The novel The Center of the World, which was released in 1998, became a popular young adult book. Among other awards, it won the Deutscher Jugendliteraturpreis in 1999 and with the Buxtehude Bull in the same year. In 2000, the novel received the Literaturpreis der Jury der jungen Leser in Vienna. Furthermore, it entered the bestseller list of the German magazine Der Spiegel as the first German children's book ever.

An international co-production between Germany and Austria, the film was produced by Neue Schönhauser Filmproduktion, mojo:pictures, and Prisma Film and distributed by Universum Film. The production received various public fundings, including money from the Filmfonds Wien and from the representative of the Federal Government for culture and media.

The film was directed by Jakob M. Erwa, who also wrote the screenplay.

Louis Hofmann starred as Phil; he was awarded with the Deutscher Schauspielerpreis 2016 as best young actor a few weeks before the premiere. Jannik Schümann played Nicholas and Svenja Jung portrayed Kat. Additional roles include Sabine Timoteo as Glass, Inka Friedrich and Nina Proll as Tereza and Pascal, Ada Philine Stappenbeck as Dianne, and Sascha Alexander Geršak as Glass's new boyfriend Michael.

The film had its world premiere at the Munich International Film festival on 26 June 2016, and was also screened at the Moscow International Film Festival. It was released theatrically in Germany on 10 November 2016 and in Austria the following day.

Reception
Boyd van Hoeij from The Hollywood Reporter welcomed that only two people are at the center of the story: "Luckily, the blossoming relationship between Phil and Nick are at the center of the movie where a hot flirt turns into a physical relationship." According to van Hoeij, it is a big forte of the film that Erwa shows how teenagers have to struggle with their sexuality, and the director proves that he has understood that, in physical love, less is sometimes more. Van Hoeij praises the actors Hofmann and Schümann, who portrayed those two boys in an affectionate and tender way, which is as interesting as the fact that those teenagers have to question themselves, due to their sexuality, if they are ever going to be happy. However, van Hoeij also noted that because of the focus on those two characters, others like Kat and Diane felt like they were neither protagonists nor side characters.

Reaction in Russia
On the verge of the press conference in the course of the premiere in Moscow, the film was rejected by some journalists and critics as propaganda as non-traditional portrayal of sexual relationships between teenagers that are not allowed to be distributed in Russia. Kirill Raslogow, the program director of the film festival, had warned his fellow countrymen beforehand: "This movie could shock the audience." The Austria Presse Agentur (APA) described the problem of the film in Russia: "With this portrayal of society, the director reproduces a downright nightmare of right-conservative Russians who often disqualify Europe as 'Gayrope'." Russian film critic Andrej Plachow, who is in charge of the selection panel of the Moscow film festival, explained: "I fear that there will be barely any companies in Russia that want to distribute this movie. They understand that they would get into trouble." However, the film received a surprisingly positive response by the audience in Moscow.

Accolades
Moscow International Film Festival 2016
 Nominated in the major competition for the Golden George

Munich International Film festival 2016 (selection)
 Nominated in the category Best Screenplay
 Nominated in the category Best Director

References

External links
 

2016 independent films
2016 LGBT-related films
2010s coming-of-age drama films
2016 romantic drama films
2010s teen drama films
2010s teen romance films
2016 films
Austrian independent films
Austrian LGBT-related films
Austrian romantic drama films
Coming-of-age romance films
Films based on German novels
Films based on romance novels
Films based on young adult literature
Films shot in Cologne
Films shot in Vienna
Gay-related films
German coming-of-age drama films
German independent films
German LGBT-related films
German romantic drama films
German teen drama films
2010s German-language films
LGBT-related coming-of-age films
LGBT-related romantic drama films
Teen LGBT-related films
2010s German films